This is a list of defunct newspapers of France.

 L'Ami du peuple
 L'Appel
 Aujourd'hui
 L'Aurore
 La Citoyenne
 Combat
 Le Constitutionnel
 L'Étoile du Déséret
 La France
 La France au travail
 France-Soir
 La Fronde
 Le Gaulois
 La Gazette
 Le Globe
 L'Illustration
 L'Intransigeant
 Je suis partout
 Le Journal
 Journal des débats
 La Liberté
 La Lune
 La Marseillaise
 Le Matin
 Le Matin de Paris
 Mülhauser Volksblatt
 La Nation française
 Le National (Paris)
 Paris-Soir
 Le Pays de France
 Le Père Duchesne (18th century)
 Le Père Duchesne (19th century)
 Le Petit Français illustré
 Le Petit Journal
 Le Petit Parisien (1876–1944)
 Au Pilori
 Revue Hebdomadaire
 Le Soleil
 Le Temps
 L'Univers
 Le Vieux Cordelier
 La Voix des Femmes (19th century)
 La Voix des femmes (20th century)
 Die Zukunft

References

France, Defunct
France
Newspapers, defunct